Dimitrovgradtsy (English: People of Dimitrovgrad) is a Bulgarian drama film from 1956 directed by Nikola Korabov and Ducho Mundrov. It is based on a screenplay by Buryan Enchev, with cinematography by Vulo Radev. The music was composed by Stefan Remenkov. Georgi Kaloyanchev, Maria Rusalieva, Ivan Dimov, and Boris Chirakov appear in the lead roles.

Plot

The film describes in socialist realism style the construction of the city of Dimitrovgrad few years after the end of World War II. It shows the enthusiasm of the young people sent there in brigades by the state, the so-called brigadiers, who worked for free to create a "city of dreams" for young people, where everything would be wonderful.

Cast

 Georgi Kaloyanchev          - Shteryo Barabata
 Maria Rusalieva                 - Nevena
 Ivan Dimov                        - Enev
 Boris Chirakov                   - Sobelev
 Inna Makarova                   - Lyudmila
 Nikola Dadov                     - Bogdan
 Sofia Karakasheva              - Penka
 Veli Chaushev                    - Nuri
 Petko Karlukovski              -  Shopa
 Vladimir Trendafilov          -  Danailov
 Yordan Spasov                   - Dochev
 Ivan Tonev                         - Misho
 Dinko Dinev                       - Zhelyasko
 Elena Hranova                    - Baba Nona
 Georgi Asenov                    - Dyado Nedyo
 Ivan Bratanov                      - Savata
 Hristo Dinev                        - Bay Rayko
 Kosta Tsonev
 Rangel Valchanov
 Lyubomir Kabakchiev
 Dimitar Bochev
 Angel Gerov
 Ani Damyanova
 Kuncho Boshnakov

External links
 

1956 films
Bulgarian black-and-white films
Bulgarian-language films
Films directed by Nikola Korabov
Bulgarian drama films
1956 drama films